The St. Kitts and Nevis Football Association is the governing body of football in the country of Saint Kitts and Nevis. They control the Saint Kitts and Nevis national football team.

Association staff

References

External links
 Official website
 Official Website of the Nevis Football Association
 Saint Kitts and Nevis at the FIFA website
 Saint Kitts and Nevis at CONCACAF site

CONCACAF member associations
Football in Saint Kitts and Nevis
Football Association
Sports organizations established in 1932
1932 establishments in Saint Kitts-Nevis-Anguilla